The Gumbayngirr State Conservation Area is a protected conservation area located in the Mid North Coast region of New South Wales, in eastern Australia.

Features
Part of the reserve is situated on a basaltic bench, with relatively fertile red soils. Pumice can be seen on the forest floor, indicating previous volcanic activity. The rainforest has not been logged, and consists of a diverse jungle of 73 tree species, forming an impressive  canopy.

Significant tree species include Stinging Tree, Yellow Carabeen, Moreton Bay Fig, Small leaf fig, Black Booyong, Bonewood, Purple Cherry, Sour Cherry and Rose Maple.

Gallery

See also

 Protected areas of New South Wales

References

External links 

State conservation areas in New South Wales
Forests of New South Wales
Mid North Coast
Protected areas established in 2003
2003 establishments in Australia